Phra Nakhon Khiri is a historical park in Phetchaburi, Thailand on a hill overlooking the city. The name Phra Nakhon Khiri means 'holy city hill', but locals know it better as Khao Wang, meaning 'hill with palace'.

The park consists of three building groups on the three peaks of the 95 m hill. On the western peak is the palace with adjoining structures. On the middle or central peak is a big chedi named Phra That Chom Phet. The eastern peak houses the Wat Phra Kaeo, the royal temple, built in similar fashion to the Wat Phra Kaeo in Bangkok. The whole complex was built as a summer palace by King Mongkut, with construction finished in 1860.

The site was registered as a historical park on 27 August 1979, with two of the palace buildings now housing a branch of the Thai National Museum.

Gallery

References

Geography of Phetchaburi province
Historical parks of Thailand
Buildings and structures in Phetchaburi province
Tourist attractions in Phetchaburi province
Hills of Thailand